John Wilson is an American documentary filmmaker. He created How To with John Wilson, a comedy-docuseries on HBO.

Early life and education 
Wilson was born in Astoria, Queens, and grew up on Long Island. He became interested in film as a teenager when his father gave him a movie camera. Wilson cites Les Blank, George Kuchar and Bruce Brown as influences.

Shortly after graduating from high school, Wilson completed a feature film called Jingle Berry. Wilson added the reference to Jingle Berry to his own Wikipedia page in season 2, episode 4 of How To with John Wilson.

While attending Binghamton University, Wilson made a short documentary, Looner, about a balloon fetish community. At Binghamton, Wilson joined an a cappella singing group, the Binghamton Crosbys.

Career 
In 2008, after graduating from college, Wilson worked for a private investigator. He has said this experience influenced his focus on the people and places of everyday life.

In 2015, Wilson was asked to go on tour with David Byrne to make an original film about his performance. Titled Temporary Color, the film has been called a "true crime concert doc about David Byrne and a pair of violent criminals". The next year, Vimeo asked Wilson to make a documentary about the Sundance Film Festival. These works caught the attention of comedian and writer Nathan Fielder, and the two eventually started collaborating after meeting in 2018.

In October 2020, How To with John Wilson premiered on HBO. The show is executive produced by Fielder, Michael Koman and Clark Reinking. On December 9, 2020, HBO ordered a second season, which premiered on 26 November 2021.

References

External links 

 Official website
 

1986 births
Living people
American documentary film directors
Film directors from New York City
Binghamton University alumni